Remire Island Airport  is an airfield serving Remire Island in the Seychelles. It has the shortest runway of all aerodromes in the Seychelles.

See also

Transport in Seychelles
List of airports in Seychelles

References

External links
OpenStreetMap - Remire Island
OurAirports - Remire Island
FallingRain - Remire Airport
HERE Maps - Remire Island

Airports in Seychelles